Intergalactic may refer to:

 "Intergalactic" (song), a song by the Beastie Boys
 Intergalactic (TV series), a 2021 UK science fiction TV series
 Intergalactic space
 Intergalactic travel, travel between galaxies in science fiction and speculation

See also
 
Interstellar (disambiguation)
Interplanetary (disambiguation)
Entergalactic (disambiguation)